Polycomb protein EED is a protein that in humans is encoded by the EED gene.

Function 
Polycomb protein EED is a member of the Polycomb-group (PcG) family. PcG family members form multimeric protein complexes, which are involved in maintaining the transcriptional repressive state of genes over successive cell generations. This protein interacts with enhancer of zeste 2, the cytoplasmic tail of integrin β7, immunodeficiency virus type 1 (HIV-1) MA protein, and histone deacetylase proteins. This protein mediates repression of gene activity through histone deacetylation, and may act as a specific regulator of integrin function. Two transcript variants encoding distinct isoforms have been identified for this gene.

Clinical significance 
In humans, a de-novo mutation in EED has been reported in an individual displaying symptoms similar to those of Weaver syndrome.

Interactions 
EED has been shown to interact with:

 EZH2, 
 HDAC1, 
 Histone deacetylase 2, 
 ITGB7,
 PPP1R8,  and
 TGS1.

References

External links

Further reading